Club Atlético Central Córdoba is an Argentine sports club based in Santiago del Estero. The club is mostly known for its football team, which currently plays in the Argentine Primera División, first division of the Argentine football league system. The club was founded by a group of railway workers and named after the Córdoba Central Railway in a similar manner to the other Central Córdoba club based in Rosario.

History

Central Córdoba has played at the highest level of Argentine football on 2 occasions, more specifically in the 1967 and 1971 Nacional championships. In the 1967 Nacional, Central Córdoba finished 14th of 16 teams, having reached its peak with the 2–1 victory over Boca Juniors in La Bombonera.

In 1971 Central Córdoba finished 13th out of 14 teams in group B, which most significant achievement was a 1–1 draw to Boca Juniors, although soon later the team would be heavily defeated at the hands of San Lorenzo by 7–1.

On 8 June 2019, Central Córdoba won promotion to the Primera División after defeating Sarmiento in the 2018–19 promotion play-off finals. It marked their return to the top-flight for the first time in 48 years.

Players

Current squad
As of 8 September 2022.

Out on loan

References

External links

 

 
Football clubs in Santiago del Estero Province
Association football clubs established in 1919
1919 establishments in Argentina
Railway association football teams